Ladol may refer to:

 Ladol, Gujarat, a town in India
 Ladol, Alabel, a barangay in Philippines
 LADOL or Lagos Deep Offshore Logistics Base, an industrial Free Zone in Nigeria